Jazin (also Romanized as Jazīn; also known as Gazi) is a village in Jazin Rural District, in the Central District of Bajestan County, Razavi Khorasan Province, Iran. At the 2006 census, its population was 2,033, in 562 families.

References 

Populated places in Bajestan County